J. Brady Anderson (born 1945) is an attorney, former American ambassador (Tanzania 1994–1997), administrator of the United States Agency for International Development (USAID),  and chairman of the board of the Overseas Private Investment Corporation.  He is chairman of the board of the Institute for Global Engagement (IGE).

It was the intention of the American Foreign Service Association (AFSA) to oppose Anderson's opposition, not based on a lack of qualifications but because “Anderson's nomination is the latest in a series of White House decisions to replace career-officer ambassadors, who have been in their embassies only a short time, with political appointees. In AFSA's view, this practice seriously threatens the unwritten but long-standing rule that a U.S. ambassador's normal tour of duty should be three years.”

Anderson received a B.A. from Rhodes College in Memphis, Tennessee in 1967, and a J.D. from the University of Arkansas School of Law in 1973. He went on to work as a private attorney in Helena, Arkansas, assistant attorney general in Little Rock, Arkansas, as a special assistant to Governor Bill Clinton and as senior law clerk to U.S. District Judge Elsijane T. Roy of Little Rock.

References

Arkansas lawyers
1945 births
Ambassadors of the United States to Tanzania
Living people